Sherwood Johnston (29 September 1927 - 9 November 2000) was an American racing driver who won racing titles on land and sea. Johnston was active in sports car racing during the 1950s. His greatest success was winning the 1952 SCCA National Sports Car Championship.

Career

Johnston began his career in April 1951, at the Thompson Speedway, in a minor national sports car race in the United States, in a privately entered Jaguar XK120, with a trip to the podium, after finishing in third place. When the SCCA National returned to Thompson in the July, Johnston would pilot the XK120 to two race victories and a third. For the following season, Johnston stepped up to race in the SCCA National full-time. Despite not winning any races outright, he still obtained sufficient points to be crowned champion at the end of the 1952.

As a result of Johnston's success, he came into contact with Briggs Cunningham, and signed for his racing team. Since the contract with Cunningham came into force in the summer, he raced a Jaguar D-Type of Art Feuerbacher, together with Bob Wilder to third place overall in the 12 Hours of Sebring. This was the first World Sports Car Championship race of motorsport history. His first trip to Le Mans saw Johnston entered in three of Cunningham's car, but did not participate in the race. Three weeks later, he had his first European success, when he partnered Briggs Cunningham to third overall in the 12 Hours of Reims, a race that didn't count towards the World Championship.

When Cunningham returned to Le Mans in 1954, Johnston was still part of the driver squad. This time he was partnered by Bill Spear, and together they finished in third place and won their class. He also undertook a number of SCCA National races for Cunningham, in various sports cars, across many classes. He scored enough points to finish second in the B Modified class.

For 1955 visit to Circuit de la Sarthe, Cunningham paired himself with Johnston, but a piston failure ensured the pair did not finish. When the team returned to the US, Johnston started racing the first of Cunningham's Jaguar D-Types, they began winning immediately. Johnston, who had started the SCCA season driving a Ferrari 375 MM, finished the year as champion of SCCA's new C/Sports Racing class, beating a young Californian, Phil Hill in the process.

On 20 May 1956, Johnston's world changed. He was part of the Cunningham team that raced at the Cumberland circuit, in their D-Types. They were joined by amateur driver Walt Hansgen. At the start of the race, Hansgen raced away and left the field behind to win, but Johnston failed to finish the race. A fortnight later, Hansgen would also be a member of the Cunningham team. At Road America, both Johnston and Hansgen rolled their D-Types. After the disaster of the 1955 Le Mans and the accident at Road America proved too much for Johnston to ignore and he retired after finishing third in a SCCA National race at Beverly Airport.

In the summer of 1969, Johnston returned to racing. He had obtained a Lola-Chevrolet T142 to race the SCCA Continental Championship for Formula 5000 cars. His best finish was 9th in the Le Circuit Continental, held at the Circuit Mont-Tremblant. For 1970, Johnston was signed by J & B Racing to race their Surtees-Ford TS5. After failing to finish any of the first four races, he announced at the Monterey Grand Prix, that he was to stop racing as his eyes wouldn’t focus quickly enough between the road and the gauges.

Achievements

In 1955 Johnston received two awards from the SCCA. He was presented with the President's Cup for demonstrating ability, competitiveness and success in the SCCA National Championship. He was also awarded the Kimberly Cup, as the driver who had shown the greatest improvement in the past year.

Racing record

Career highlights

Complete 24 Hours of Le Mans results

Complete 12 Hours of Sebring results

Complete 12 Hours of Reims results

References

1927 births
24 Hours of Le Mans drivers
12 Hours of Sebring drivers
12 Hours of Reims drivers
World Sportscar Championship drivers
Racing drivers from California
2000 deaths
SCCA National Championship Runoffs winners